The 2002 All-Ireland Senior Club Camogie Championship for the leading clubs in the women's team field sport of camogie was won for the third year in succession by Pearse's from Galway, who defeated St Ibar’s from Wexford in the final, played at Ballinasloe.

Arrangements
The championship was organised on the traditional provincial system used in Gaelic Games since the 1880s, with Cashel and Keady Lámh Dhearg winning the championships of the other two provinces. Orla Kilkenny’s goal gave Pearse’s victory over 2001 finalists Cashel in the semi-final. Two goals from Michelle Hearne and one each from Mag Kelly, Michelle Murphy and Kate Kelly gave St Ibar’s a final place against Keady.

The Final
Pearses led by ten points at half time en route to their third successive All-Ireland.

Final stages

References

External links
 Camogie Association

2002 in camogie
2002